Dals-Ed Municipality (Dals-Eds kommun) is a  municipality in Västra Götaland County in western Sweden, on the border to Norway. Its seat is located in the town of Ed.

The present municipality was formed during the local government reform of 1952 through the amalgamation of six former units. Its territory was not affected by the 1971 reform.

Locality
There is only one locality with more than 200 inhabitants in the municipality, and that is the seat Ed.

Tourism
Dals-Ed Municipality, located in the historical province of Dalsland, has a united tourism motto for Dalsland, saying that Dalsland, with its population of 50,000, is a place where one will not feel crowded. This is perhaps most fitting for Dals-Ed, as it is the sparsest populated municipality in Västra Götaland County, with 6.7 inhabitants per km2.

The municipality promises a quiet environment. The nature hosts some 400 lakes for bathing, canoeing, fishing or boat tours. There are also several nature reserves, and the northernmost oak woods of Sweden grow in the municipality. In addition, the large Tresticklan National Park is contained within the municipality.

Historically Dals-Ed is rewarding for those interested in the ancient. Some 60 grave fields and burial places are situated here.

References
Official site

External links

Dals-Ed Municipality - Official site

Municipalities of Västra Götaland County
North Älvsborg